2008–09 Eerste Klasse was a Dutch association football season of the Eerste Klasse.

Saturday champions were:
 A: ODIN '59
 B: TOGR
 C: LRC Leerdam
 D: CSV Apeldoorn
 E: ACV Assen

Sunday champions were:
 A: FC Chabab
 B: SC Feyenoord
 C: SV OSS '20
 D: UDI '19
 E: Juliana '31
 F: VV Nieuw Buinen

References

Eerste Klasse seasons
4